Boy in the Box is the second album by Corey Hart, released in 1985. It generated four charted singles. The song "Never Surrender" won a Juno Award in 1985 for "Single of the Year" and reached #3 on the U.S. Hot 100 (#1 for one week, sales only).

Track listing 
All songs written by Corey Hart, except as noted.

"Boy in the Box" - 4:29
"Komrade Kiev" - 4:20
"Never Surrender" - 4:58
"Sunny Place, Shady People" - 4:21
"Eurasian Eyes" - 5:30
"Everything in My Heart" - 4:53
"Silent Talking" - 4:36
"Waiting for You" - 4:27
"Water from the Moon" - 3:47 (Hart, Russell Boswell)

Charts

Personnel 
 Corey Hart – lead and backing vocals
 Gary Breit – keyboards
 Jon Astley – Fairlight programming, Oberheim DMX programming
 Michael Hehir – lead and rhythm guitars
 Russell Boswell – bass
 Bruce Moffet –  percussion
 Andy Hamilton – saxophones
 Virgil Night – additional backing vocals on "Boy in the Box"
 Dalbello –  additional backing vocals on "Sunny Place - Shady People"

Production 
 Corey Hart – producer 
 Jon Astley – producer, engineer 
 Phil Chapman – producer, engineer 
 Bob Ludwig – mastering at Masterdisk (New York, NY).
 Henry Marquez – art direction 
 Michael Hodgson – design 
 Nels Israelson – front cover photography 
 John Webber – back cover photography 
 Bruce Brault – management

Certifications
On February 1, 1986, Boy in the Box was certified diamond by Music Canada.

Notes

References
 Liner notes from Boy in the Box album.

1985 albums
Corey Hart (singer) albums
Aquarius Records (Canada) albums
EMI America Records albums
Albums produced by Jon Astley
Albums recorded at Le Studio